Leonine verse is a type of versification based on internal rhyme, and commonly used in Latin verse of the European Middle Ages. The invention of such conscious rhymes, foreign to Classical Latin poetry, is traditionally attributed to a probably apocryphal monk Leonius, who is supposed to be the author of a history of the Old Testament (Historia Sacra) preserved in the Bibliothèque Nationale of Paris. This "history" is composed in Latin verses which rhyme in the center.  It is possible that this Leonius is the same person as Leoninus, a Benedictine musician of the twelfth century, in which case he would not have been the original inventor of the form. It is sometimes referred to disparagingly as "jangling verse" by classical purists, for example 19th century antiquaries, who consider it absurd and coarse and a corruption of and offensive to the high ideals of classical literature.

In English, the rhyme may be between a word within the line (often before a caesura) and the word at the end. Shakespeare used it to denote absurd characters, as in the speech of Caliban in The Tempest.

Examples

Latin
Leonine verses from the tomb of the Venerable Bede in the Gallee Chapel of Durham Cathedral, possibly from the 8th century
HAC SUNT IN FOSSA – BEDAE VENERABILIS OSSA

Leonine verses in the mosaic on top of the marble ciborio in the Chiesa di Santa Maria in Portico in Campitelli
Hic est illa PIAE – Genitricis Imago MarIAEQuae discumbENTI – Gallae patuit metuENTI

Leonine verses in the Basilica di Santa Maria Assunta in Torcello, around 1100
Formula virtutis – Maris astrum, Porta salutisProle Maria levat – quos conjuge subdidit EvaSum deus atq(ue) caro – patris et sum matris imagonon piger ad lapsum – set flentis p(ro)ximus adsum 

Leonine verses in mosaic in the apse of the Cathedral of Cefalù, around 1150
Factus homo Factor – hominis factique RedemptorIudico corporeus – corpora corda Deus

Leonine verses in the Portale dell'abbazia di Leno dell'abate Gunterio, in the year 1200
HAEC NON LENENSIS – TELLUS FERTUR LEONENSISCUI NON LENONES – NOMEN POSUERE LEONESFORMA LEONINA – SIGNANS BIS MARMORA BINADICITUR OFFERRE – LOCA VOCE NON AUTEM REFELIX EST NOMEN – FELIX EST NOMINIS OMENQUOD NON LENONES – POSUERUNT IMMO LEONES

Another very famous poem in a tripart Leonine rhyme is the De Contemptu Mundi of Bernard of Cluny, whose first book begins:
Hora novissima, tempora pessima sunt, vigilemus:Ecce minaciter, imminet arbiter, ille supremus.Imminet imminet, ut mala terminet, æqua coronet,Recta remuneret, anxia liberet, æthera donet.
(These current days are the worst of times: let us keep watch.Behold the menacing arrival of the Supreme Judge.He is coming, He is coming to end evil, crown the just,reward the right, set the worried free and grant eternal life.)
As this example of tripartiti dactylici caudati (dactylic hexameter rhyming couplets divided into three) shows, the internal rhymes of leonine verse may be based on tripartition of the line (as opposed to a caesura in the center of the verse) and do not necessarily involve the end of the line at all.

In 1893, the American composer Horatio Parker set the Hora novissima to music in his cantata of the same name.

The epitaph of Count Alan Rufus, dated by Richard Sharpe and others to 1093, is described by André Wilmart as being in Leonine hexameter:

Stella nuit regni : comitis caro marcet Alani :
Anglia turbatur : satraparum flos cineratur :
Iam Brito flos regum, modo marcor in ordine rerum
Praecepto legum, nitet ortus sanguine regum.
Dux uiguit summus, rutilans a rege secundus.
Hunc cernens plora : ‘requies sibi sit, Deus’ ora.
Vixit nobilium : praefulgens stirpe Brittonum.

English

A leonine rhyme is used by Edward Lear in his humorous poem "The Owl and the Pussy Cat":

 They took some honey, and plenty of money

References

Rhyme
Medieval Latin poetry
Genres of poetry
Types of verses